Joseph ben Ephraim Karo, also spelled Yosef Caro, or Qaro (1488 – March 24, 1575, 13 Nisan 5335 A.M.), was the author of the last great codification of Jewish law, the Beit Yosef, and its popular analogue, the Shulchan Arukh. To this end he is often referred to as HaMechaber ("The Author") and as Maran ("Our Master").

Biography
Joseph Karo was born in Toledo in 1488. In 1492, aged four, he was expelled from Spain with his family as a result of the Alhambra Decree and subsequently settled in the Kingdom of Portugal. After the expulsion of the Jews from Portugal in 1497, the Ottomans invited the Jews to settle within their empire. Karo went with his parents, after a brief move to Morocco, to Nikopolis, then a city under Ottoman rule. In Nikopol, he received his first instruction from his father, who was himself an eminent Talmudist. He was married twice, firstly to Isaac Saba's daughter, and, then after her death, to the daughter of Hayyim Albalag, both of these men being well-known Talmudists.

Between 1520 and 1522 Karo settled at Adrianople. He later settled in the city of Safed, Ottoman Galilee, where he arrived about 1535, having en route spent several years at Salonica (1533) and Istanbul. By 1555, Joseph Karo was already a resident of the village Biriyya near Safed, during which year he completed writing the first order of the Shulhan Arukh, Orach Chaim.

Rabbinic career
For a short while he lived in Nikopol, but decided to make his way to the Land of Israel so that he could immerse himself in its sanctity and complete his written works. Passing through Salonica, he met the great kabbalist Joseph Taitazak. He continued his journey to the Holy Land via Egypt and eventually settled in Safed.

At Safed he met Jacob Berab and was soon appointed a member of his rabbinical court. Berab exerted great influence upon him, and Karo became an enthusiastic supporter of Berab's plans for the reinstitution of semicha (rabbinical ordination) which had been in abeyance for over 11 centuries. Karo was one of the first he ordained and after Berab's death, Karo tried to perpetuate the scheme by ordaining his pupil Moshe Alshich, but he finally gave up his endeavors, convinced that he could not overcome the opposition to ordination. Karo also established a yeshiva where he taught Torah to over 200 students.

A Yemenite Jewish traveler, Zechariah (Yaḥya) al-Dhahiri, visited Rabbi Karo's yeshiva in Safed, in circa 1567 CE and wrote of his impressions:

When Jacob Berab died, Karo was regarded as his successor, and together with Rabbi Moshe of Trani he headed the Rabbinical Court of Safed. In fact, by this time, the Rabbinical Court of Safed had become the central rabbinical court in all of Old Yishuv (southern Ottoman Syria), and indeed of the diaspora as well. Thus there was not a single matter of national or global importance that did not come to the attention and ruling of the Safed Beth Din. Its rulings were accepted as final and conclusive, and Karo's halachic decisions and clarifications were sought by sages from every corner of the diaspora. Rabbi Joseph Karo was also visited in Safed by the great Egyptian scholars of his day, Rabbi David ibn Abi Zimra and Rabbi Yaakov Castro. He came to be regarded as the leader of the entire generation.

In a dramatic testimonial, Rabbi Shlomo Alkabetz testified that in Salonica, Karo had become one of the rare individuals who merited to be instructed by a maggid—a private angelic teacher who revealed to him many kabbalistic teachings. The maggid exhorted Karo to sanctify and purify himself, and he revealed to him events that would take place in the future. In Shaarei Kedusha, Rabbi Chaim Vital explains that visitation by a maggid is a form of Divine Inspiration (ruach hakodesh). The teachings of the maggid are recorded in his published work titled Maggid Meisharim, although Rabbi Chaim Joseph David Azulai notes that only about one fiftieth of the manuscript was ever published, (see Works). However, in numerous places in Maggid Meisharim it is stated that, "I am the Mishna that speaks in your mouth," indicating that the Oral Torah itself (of which the Mishna is the fundamental part) spoke within him. (However, these two explanations are not necessarily contradictory—in the merit of the Mishna Karo constantly reviewed, he was worthy of an angelic teacher).

The Maggid promised him that he would have the merit of settling in the Land of Israel, and this promise was fulfilled. Another promise, that he would merit to die a martyr's death sanctifying God's Name like Rabbi Shlomo Molcho had merited, did not transpire for an unspecified reason.

His reputation during the last thirty years of his life was greater than that of almost any other rabbi since Maimonides. The Italian Azariah dei Rossi, though his views differed widely from Karo's, collected money among the rich Italian Jews for the purpose of having a work of Karo's printed; and Moses Isserles compelled the recognition of one of Karo's decisions at Kraków, although he had questions on the ruling.

When some members of the community of Carpentras, France, believed themselves to have been unjustly treated by the majority in a matter relating to taxes, they appealed to Karo, whose letter was sufficient to restore to them their rights (Rev. Etudes Juives 18:133–136). In the East, Karo's authority was, if possible, even greater. His name heads the decree of excommunication directed against Daud, Joseph Nasi's agent; and it was Caro who commissioned Elisha Gallico to draw up a decree to be distributed among all Jews, ordering that Dei Rossi's "Me'or 'Enayim" be burned. But, Caro dying before it was ready for him to sign, the decree was not promulgated, and the rabbis of Mantua contented themselves with forbidding the reading of the work by Jews under twenty-five years of age.  Several funeral orations delivered on that occasion have been preserved (Moses Albelda, Darash Mosheh; Samuel Katzenellenbogen, Derashot), as well as some elegies from Karo's passing.

Published works

Karo's literary works are considered among the masterpieces of rabbinic literature. He published during his lifetime:
 Beit Yosef (בית יוסף), a commentary on Arba'ah Turim, the current work of Jewish law in his days. In this commentary Karo shows an astounding mastery over the Talmud and the legalistic literature of the Middle Ages. He felt called upon to systematize the laws and customs of Judaism in face of the disintegration caused by the Spanish expulsion.
 Shulchan Aruch (שולחן ערוך), a condensation of his decisions in Beth Yosef. Finished in 1555, this code was published in four parts in 1565.
 Kessef Mishneh (כסף משנה) (written in Nikopol, published Venice, 1574–75), a commentary of Mishneh Torah by Maimonides. In the introduction, Karo writes that his goal was to quote the source of each law in the Mishneh Torah, and to defend the work from the criticisms of the Ravad, Rabbi Abraham ben David.

After his death there appeared:
 Bedek ha-Bayit (בדק הבית) (Salonica, 1605), supplements and corrections to Beth Yosef;
 Kelalei ha-Talmud (כללי התלמוד) (Salonica, 1598), on the methodology of the Talmud;
 Avkath Rochel (אבקת רוכל) (Salonica, 1791), Responsa
 Maggid Meisharim (מגיד מישרים) (Lublin, 1646), and supplements (Venice, 1646)
 Derashot (דרשות) (Salonica, 1799), speeches, in the collection 'Oz Tzaddikim'.

Maggid Meisharim

The Maggid Meisharim (1646, Preacher of Righteousness) is a mystical diary in which Karo during a period of fifty years recorded the nocturnal visits of an angelic being, his heavenly mentor, the personified Mishna (the authoritative collection of Jewish Oral Law). His visitor spurred him to acts of righteousness and even asceticism, exhorted him to study the Kabbala, and reproved him for moral laxities.

Burial place
He is buried in Old Cemetery of Tzfat / Safed.

Other notable rabbis also buried in Old Cemetery of Tzfat / Safed:
 Ari HaKadosh
 Alshich Hakadosh
 Shlomo Halevi Alkabetz
 Moses ben Jacob Cordovero

References

External links
 Joseph b. Ephraim Caro
 Video Lecture on Yosef Karo by Dr. Henry Abramson
 Letter sent and signed by Joseph Karo in Safed, from the Cairo Genizah Collection at Cambridge University Library

1488 births
1575 deaths
16th-century Sephardi Jews
16th-century rabbis from the Ottoman Empire
Spanish emigrants to the Ottoman Empire
Jews expelled from Spain in 1492
Kabbalists
People from Toledo, Spain
Rabbis in Ottoman Galilee
Rabbis in Safed
Sephardi rabbis in Ottoman Palestine
Exponents of Jewish law
Burials at the Old Jewish Cemetery, Safed
Angelic visionaries
Authors of books on Jewish law